Marié Heese (born 27 September 1942, Cape Town) is a South African novelist and teacher. She won the 2010 Commonwealth Writers' Prize for Africa.

Life
She is the daughter of Audrey Blignault.
She grew up in Cape Town. She studied at the Stellenbosch University and University of South Africa (UNISA).
She married Chris Heese; they have three children.

Works
Die uurwerk kantel, Tafelberg-uitgewers, 1976, 
Tyd van beslissing: 'n roman, Perskor, 1987, 
The Double Crown, Human & Rousseau, 2009; International Publishers Marketing, 2011,

Essays
Tokkelspel, Tafelberg, 1972,

Travel
Die honger reisiger, Tafelberg,

Children's books
Die Pikkewouters van Amper-Stamperland, Human & Rousseau, 1984
Avonture in Amper-Stamperland, Human & Rousseau, 1986

Editor
 Audrey Blignault: Uit die dagboek van 'n vrou, Tafelberg, 2009,

References

External links
"Interview with Commonwealth Writers Prize 2010 Nominee Dr Marie Heese", pageturners, 22 April 2010

South African women novelists
1942 births
Stellenbosch University alumni
University of South Africa alumni
Writers from Cape Town
Living people
Alumni of Hoërskool Jan van Riebeeck